The 2002–03 season was Galatasaray's 99th in existence and the 45th consecutive season in the Süper Lig. This article shows statistics of the club's players in the season, and also lists all matches that the club have played in the season.

Squad statistics

Players in / out

In

Out

Süper Lig

Standings

Matches

Türkiye Kupası
Kick-off listed in local time (EET)

Second round

Third round

Quarter-final

UEFA Champions League

Group stage

Friendlies

Attendance

 Sold season tickets: 7,547

References

Galatasaray S.K. (football) seasons
Galatasaray S.K.
2000s in Istanbul
Galatasaray Sports Club 2002–03 season